Fábio Santos Romeu (born 16 September 1985 in São Paulo), known simply as Fábio Santos, is a Brazilian footballer who plays as a left back for Corinthians in the Campeonato Brasileiro.

Fábio Santos has a reputation for being a penalty kick specialist.

Club career

São Paulo

Fábio Santos started his career for São Paulo as a youth player. He was promoted to first team in 2003 and feature in the major club's honours in this period, including the Copa Libertadores and FIFA Club World Cup. Despite of his lack of playing time during this period, he out on loan to J1 League giants Kashima Antlers.

Loan years

He spend the 2006 season playing for Kashima Antlers, making 20 appearances and scoring three goals. In 2007, Fábio returned to Brazil to play for Cruzeiro, but failed to gain a spot in first team and was released in May. After that, he agreed a one-year loan deal with Ligue 1 side AS Monaco. In August 2008, he returned again to Brazil after failing to impress and signed a two-year contract with Santos.

Grêmio

Fábio Santos was released from Santos in December, and signed for Grêmio.

Corinthians

Fábio Santos was announced as Corinthians's player on 12 January 2011 and has come to be the bench player to Roberto Carlos's position. With Roberto Carlos's departure to Russian football, on early of 2011, Santos gained the position, becoming a key player in subsequent tournaments. He was a major part of the victories in the 2011 Campeonato Brasileiro Série A 2012 Copa Libertadores, 2012 FIFA Club World Cup, 2013 Campeonato Paulista and 2013 Recopa Sudamericana.

Cruz Azul
On 18 June 2015, it was announced that Fábio Santos reached a deal with Mexican club Cruz Azul. The values of the transfer were undisclosed. During his time at Cruz Azul, he made 26 appearances scoring 3 goals. During his first season he had success playing most of the first season under manager Sergio Bueno. However, during his second season under new manager Tomas Boy, he had little playing time. Most of his appearances were coming off the bench. After Cruz Azul failed to qualify for the playoffs for the Clausura 2016 in the Liga MX, him along with other leftback Fausto Pinto, were told they were not going to continue to the next season.

Atletico Mineiro
On 14 June 2016, Fábio Santos joined Atlético Mineiro on a two-year contract. Later that year, he received the Bola de Prata award as the best left back of the 2016 Campeonato Brasileiro Série A. On 7 May 2017, he won his first trophy with the club after beating arch-rivals Cruzeiro in the 2017 Campeonato Mineiro final. On 4 March 2018, he made his 100th appearance for the club.

Return to Corinthians
On 19 October 2020, Fábio Santos returned to Corinthians on a free transfer.

International career
He was capped for Brazil national Under-20 team to play for the 2005 FIFA World Youth Championship.

Fabio was placed in the preliminary squad for the 2008 Summer Olympics, but did not gain a place in the tournament's final squad by coach Dunga.

In September 2012, Fábio Santos was called up for Brazil national football team by Mano Menezes to Superclásico de las Américas, and on September 20, he debuted for Seleção in the 2–1 victory against Argentina, at Estádio Serra Dourada in Goiânia. On 11 November 2016, Fabio was called again by Tite.

Career statistics

International

Honours

Club
São Paulo
 Copa Libertadores: 2005
 FIFA Club World Cup: 2005

Grêmio
Campeonato Gaúcho: 2010

Corinthians
Campeonato Brasileiro Série A: 2011, 2015
Copa Libertadores: 2012
FIFA Club World Cup: 2012
Campeonato Paulista: 2013
Recopa Sudamericana: 2013

Atlético Mineiro
Campeonato Mineiro: 2017

National team
Brazil
 Chile Octagonal Tournament: 2005
Superclásico de las Américas: 2012

Individual

References

External links 

CBF
Guardian Stats Centre

soccerterminal

1985 births
Living people
Association football defenders
Brazilian footballers
Brazil youth international footballers
Brazil under-20 international footballers
Brazil international footballers
Brazilian expatriate footballers
Expatriate footballers in Japan
Expatriate footballers in France
Expatriate footballers in Monaco
São Paulo FC players
J1 League players
Kashima Antlers players
Cruzeiro Esporte Clube players
AS Monaco FC players
Santos FC players
Grêmio Foot-Ball Porto Alegrense players
Sport Club Corinthians Paulista players
Cruz Azul footballers
Clube Atlético Mineiro players
Campeonato Brasileiro Série A players
Ligue 1 players
Liga MX players
Footballers from São Paulo